Andreson Dourado Ribas (born 23 April 1985 in Miguel Calmon, Bahia), commonly known as Andreson, is a Brazilian football player, playing as a midfielder.

External links
 
 

Living people
1985 births
Brazilian footballers
FC Vilnius players
ŁKS Łódź players
Expatriate footballers in Poland
Brazilian expatriates in Poland
Association football midfielders